"It's Oh So Quiet" is a song by American singer Betty Hutton, released in 1951 as the B-side to the single "Murder, He Says". It is a cover of the German song "Und jetzt ist es still", performed by Horst Winter in 1948, with music written by Austrian composer Hans Lang and German lyrics by Erich Meder. The English lyrics were written by Bert Reisfeld. A French title, "Tout est tranquille", was performed in 1949 by Ginette Garcin and the Jacques Hélian Orchestra.

Icelandic musician Björk covered the song as the third single from her second album Post (1995) and remains her biggest hit, reaching number 4 in the UK and spending 15 weeks on the UK Singles Chart. Fueled by the Spike Jonze-directed music video, the single also shot Björk into the spotlight in Australia, where it reached number 6. In the United Kingdom the single has been certified as Gold, having sold upwards of 400,000 copies.

In 2002, Brittany Murphy made a performance of this song, joined by The Pussycat Dolls. In 2005, Lucy Woodward covered the song for the soundtrack for the film Ice Princess. This version was also used in the second trailer for the 2020 film Birds of Prey. A version of "It's Oh So Quiet" was used in a Maybelline advertisement, and a version by Amanda Fondell was used in an advertisement for Candy Crush Saga. Hutton's version was used in a commercial for the Acura TLX in 2020 and for Facebook in 2021.

Björk version

The song was covered by Icelandic musician Björk in 1995. It was released as the third single from her second album Post (1995) and remains her biggest hit, reaching number 4 in the UK and spending 15 weeks on the UK Singles Chart. Fueled by the Spike Jonze-directed music video, the single also shot Björk into the spotlight in Australia, where it reached number 6. In the United Kingdom the single has been certified as Gold, having sold upwards of 400,000 copies.

Critical reception
James Masterton for Dotmusic said Björk's version of the song "stands out as one of the most bizarre singles she has ever recorded." He described it "as Icelandic pixie meets the sound of Frank Sinatra to almost perfect effect." Alan Jones from Music Week wrote, "Alternating soft and gentle passages with noisy outbursts on which Bjork squawks and is reinforced by an old-fashioned big band section, this is very much a novelty, but one that works and well."

Music video

Background
The music video, directed by Spike Jonze, was shot in San Fernando Valley, California. It is a homage to Hollywood's Technicolor musicals that drew inspiration from Busby Berkeley and Jacques Demy's The Umbrellas of Cherbourg. Like Demy, Jonze "mines the magical from the mundane," as he transforms a drab auto shop into the location where Björk dances and sings with a full dance company, an attempt to reflect the "exuberance" of her vocal performance. The whispered verse sections of the track are filmed in slow motion, "much as Tsai's cinematography takes place over an extended timeframe"; while the shouted musical sections "reflect back on ordinary or 'lived' reality in a manner that denaturalizes the banal—turning it, more than the fantasy of musical spectacle, into something surreal."

Synopsis
The video begins as Björk emerges from an extremely dirty washroom in an auto shop. She dances along with the auto workers for the first chorus, then emerges from the shop. During the second chorus, she dances tap with a few people outside of the auto shop. Björk continues to walk along the street, dancing with several elderly women and their umbrellas before settling to rest her arms on top of a mailbox for the final verse. The mailbox comes alive and dances along with Björk during this chorus. Björk then runs down the street and into the road, where the rest of the town has decided to join her for one large dance number. The video ends with Björk floating up above the townsfolk and hushing the viewer.

Release 
The music video for "It's Oh So Quiet" premiered on MTV during the week ending on August 20, 1995.

Awards and nominations
"It's Oh So Quiet" video received six nominations for the MTV Video Music Awards for 1996 including Best Female Video, Best Art Direction, Breakthrough Video, Best Direction in a Video, International Viewer's Choice Award — MTV Europe, and Best Choreography in a Video, winning in the latter category. The video was also nominated for a Grammy Award for Best Music Video - Short Form, losing to "Scream" by Michael Jackson and his sister Janet.
In October 2007, MuchMoreMusic placed "It's Oh So Quiet" as number 8 of the Top 40 Most Memorable Music Videos on Listed.

Track listings

 UK CD1
 "It's Oh So Quiet"
 "You've Been Flirting Again" (Flirt Is a Promise Mix)
 "Hyperballad" (Over the Edge Mix)
 "Sweet Sweet Intuition"

 UK CD2, Australian and Japanese CD single
 "It's Oh So Quiet"
 "Hyperballad" (Brodsky Quartet version)
 "Hyperballad" (Girls Blouse Mix)
 "My Spine"

 UK and Australian cassette single, European CD single
 "It's Oh So Quiet"
 "You've Been Flirting Again" (Flirt Is a Promise Mix)

 US CD and cassette single
 "It's Oh So Quiet"
 "You've Been Flirting Again" (Icelandic mix)

Charts

Weekly charts

Year-end charts

Certifications

References

External links
 List of "It's Oh So Quiet" releases at discogs

1951 singles
1951 songs
1995 singles
Björk songs
Compositions by Hans Lang
Music videos directed by Spike Jonze
Music videos shot in the United States
Number-one singles in Iceland
One Little Indian Records singles
Song recordings produced by Björk
Song recordings produced by Nellee Hooper